Vahhabiyeh (also Romanized as Vahhābīyeh; also known as Vahābī) is a village in Anaqcheh Rural District, in the Central District of Ahvaz County, Khuzestan Province, Iran. At the 2006 census, its population was 259, in 51 families.

References 

Populated places in Ahvaz County